Anton Alexander is an actor born in London. Alexander was the recipient of the Best Actor award for The Novel at the NYLA International Film Awards 2013. He trained at the Bristol Old Vic Theatre School, and his TV and film appearances include EastEnders, The Adventures of Sherlock Holmes (The Greek Interpreter), King David and Cemetery Man - a cult Italian horror film starring Rupert Everett, and hailed by Martin Scorsese as one of the best Italian films of the 1990s. He played Hirah in the Emmy Award-winning TV film, Joseph and Kim Roosevelt in the TV mini series . He worked with Sir Ridley Scott twice in 2013, playing the machiavellian Roccagiovine in The Vatican and the Hebrew spy Dathan in Exodus: Gods and Kings.

Selected filmography 
  Gore (2018)  as the Reporter                                                                                                                                                                                                          
  Taboo (2017) as Code Duello                          
 Exodus: Gods and Kings (2015) as Dathan                                                                                                                         
 The Vatican (2013) as Urbano Roccagiovine
 The Best Offer (2013) as Real Estate Agent
 Romeo and Juliet (2013) as Abraham
 The Novel (2011) as Edgar Allan Poe
 The Power of Three (2011) as Nigel
 Gli occhi dell'altro (2005) as Nick Forbes
  (2003) as Kim Roosevelt
 Ferrari (2003) as lawyer to Enzo Ferrari
  (1999) as Air Force Officer
 Joseph (1995) as Hirah
 Cemetery Man (Dellamorte Dellamore) (1994) as Franco
 EastEnders (1990) as accountant to Ian Beale
 The Adventures of Sherlock Holmes (1985) as Paul Kratides
 King David (1985) as Runner

References

External links 
 
"Dellamorte Dellamore" appraisal.

Living people
Male actors from London
Year of birth missing (living people)
English male film actors
English male television actors
20th-century English male actors
21st-century English male actors
Alumni of Bristol Old Vic Theatre School